William Lucas or Bill Lucas may refer to:

William Lucas (Virginia politician) (1800–1877), politician and lawyer from Virginia
William Brooks Lucas, state legislator in the United States
William V. Lucas (1835–1921), U.S. Republican politician representing South Dakota
William Thomas Lucas (1875–1973), farmer and Canadian federal politician
William Lucas (bishop) (1883–1945), inaugural Bishop of Masasi
Bill Lucas (runner) (1917–2018), British long-distance runner
Billy Lucas (1918–1998), Welsh footballer
William R. Lucas (born 1922), fourth Director of the NASA Marshall Space Flight Center
Bill Lucas (architect) (1924–2001), Australian architect
William Lucas (actor) (1925–2016), British film and television actor
William Lucas (Michigan politician) (1928–2022), Wayne County executive and 1986 Michigan gubernatorial candidate
Bill Lucas (baseball) (1936–1979), American baseball executive
Bill Lucas (rower) (born 1987), British rower
Bill Lucas (academic) (born 1956), social entrepreneur, author, researcher and motivational speaker
William Brooks Lucas, state legislature from Mississippi